Entogonia is a genus of moths in the family Geometridae described by Warren in 1904.

References

Oenochrominae